Emmanuel Christian School may refer to:

Emmanuel Christian School, Tasmania, in Rokeby, Tasmania, Australia
Emmanuel Christian School, Quebec, in Dollard-des-Ormeaux, Quebec, Canada
Emmanuel Christian School, Christchurch, a school in Christchurch, New Zealand
Emmanuel Christian School, Leicester, in Leicestershire, UK
Emmanuel Christian School (Indiana), in Wabash, Indiana; a high school in Indiana, US
Emmanuel Christian School (Toledo, Ohio), US